Sebastião Lopes de Calheiros e Meneses  (24 January 1816 – 20 November 1899) was a Portuguese colonial administrator. He was the governor of Cape Verde and of Angola. He was born on 24 January 1816 in Geraz do Lima, northern Portugal. His father was Pedro Lopes de Calheiros e Meneses. He succeeded António Maria Barreiros Arrobas as governor of Cape Verde on 28 March 1858, and was succeeded by Januário Correia de Almeida in June 1860. He succeeded Carlos Augusto Franco as governor of Angola in February 1861, and was succeeded by José Baptista de Andrade in September 1862. He was Minister of Public Works in the government of Sá da Bandeira (1868-1869). He died in Viana do Castelo on 20 November 1899.

See also
List of colonial governors of Cape Verde
List of colonial governors of Angola

References

1816 births
1899 deaths
People from Viana do Castelo
Colonial heads of Cape Verde
Governors of Portuguese Angola
Finance ministers of Portugal
Government ministers of Portugal
Portuguese colonial governors and administrators